Hangedup is the self-titled album by Hangedup. It was released in May 2001 on Constellation Records.  Its catalog number is CST016.

Ian Ilavsky plays bass on tracks 3 and 8.  Efrim Menuck provides additional overdubs on Bring Yr Scuba Gear.

Track listing
"Winternational"
"Propane Tank"
"Powered By Steam"
"New Blue Monday" (title on the insert; the inside cover calls it "New Blue Order")
"Tapping"
"Czech Disco Pt.II"
"Wilt"
"Bring Yr Scuba Gear"

References

2001 albums
Hangedup albums
Constellation Records (Canada) albums